999 or triple nine most often refers to:

 999 (emergency telephone number), a telephone number for the emergency services in several countries
 999 (number), an integer
 AD 999, a year
 999 BC, a year

Books
 999 (anthology) or 999: Twenty-nine Original Tales of Horror and Suspense, a 1999 anthology of short stories
 Galaxy Express 999, a manga and anime created by Leiji Matsumoto

Film and TV
 Triple 9, a 2016 heist-thriller film
 999 (British TV series), a British programme presented by Michael Buerk that aired on the BBC
 999 (Malaysian TV series), a 2004 Malaysian crime reality television series
 999: What's Your Emergency?, a 2012 British factual programme following the emergency service
 Triple Nine (TV series), a Singaporean television series running from 1995 to 1999

Music
 999 (band), a London punk rock band active since the 1970s
 999 (album), a self-titled album by the band 999
 999 (Selena Gomez and Camilo song)
 "999" (Kent song)
 "999", a song from Keith Richards' album Main Offender (1992)
 999, a number often used by Juice WRLD

Transportation
 Ducati 999, an Italian motorcycle
 New York Central and Hudson River Railroad No. 999, the first steam locomotive in the United States to operate at faster than 100 mph
 Ford 999, a pioneering 1902 racer named for the locomotive

Other uses
 999 Zachia, an asteroid
 9–9–9 Plan, a tax plan proposed by 2012 Republican presidential candidate Herman Cain
 999 phone charging myth, an urban myth that calling the emergency services charges mobile phones
 Nine (purity), an informal way of ranking purity; "three nines" would be 99.9% pure
 "Three nines" as a level of high availability (99.9%)
 Triple Nine Society, a society for people with IQs in the 99.9th percentile
 Nine Hours, Nine Persons, Nine Doors, a 2009 video game developed by Chunsoft

See also
 0.999... for proofs that 0.999... is equal to 1